CSE Insurance Group, headquartered in Walnut Creek, California, is an American provider of property and casualty insurance. The company sells policies through the independent agent channel with roughly 700 agencies carrying their products, as well as through an online and phone direct marketing center.

About
Both channels market the products: homeowners, auto, landlords, boat, liability, commercial and umbrella insurance. Areas of operation include Arizona, California, Colorado, Idaho, Nevada, Oregon, Utah, Virginia, Washington and Washington D.C.
CSE owns and markets a trademarked auto insurance product called SAVE (Savings Advantage by Vehicle) whereby drivers pay for the exact miles they drive during that year.

The company is a subsidiary of the Covéa Insurance Group (Société de Groupe d'Assurance Mutuelle Covéa) headquartered in Paris, France.

History
CSE was founded in 1949 in San Francisco, California by Nelson Nichols. Originally, the company served only firefighters, police officers, postal workers and other government employees.

In 1980, CSE extended its offerings to the general public. 
In 2009, CSE relocated from San Francisco, to Walnut Creek. 
In 2010 and 2011, CSE was included in Ward's 50 for top performing companies in the Property Casualty field.
A.M. Best Company has Given CSE Insurance Group a rating of A− (Excellent) and an issuer credit rating of A−.

References

External links
CSE Insurance Group website
CSEAA - CSE Agents Association

Insurance companies of the United States
Companies based in Contra Costa County, California
Walnut Creek, California
Financial services companies established in 1949
Financial services companies based in California
American companies established in 1949
1949 establishments in California